Edgar Louis Yaeger (1904–1997) was an American modernist painter from Detroit, Michigan.

Yaeger studied under Robert A. Herzberg at the Detroit School of Fine and Applied Arts, by which he was awarded the Founder's Society Purchase Prize. Subsequently, with the backing of the Anna Scripps Whitcomb Traveling Scholarship, Yaeger embarked on a study tour of eight European countries, from France to Czechoslovakia.

Yaeger was best known for his contributions to the Michigan Federal Art project and the Works Progress Administration scheme during the Depression era, to which he contributed a number of murals that were displayed in public buildings. Some of his contributions are located at the West Quad Dormitory at the University of Michigan and the Detroit Public Lighting Commission Building.

Biography - A Life of Art

Edgar Yaeger never went out of his way to be noticed. “Quiet,” “modest” and “unassuming” were likely the three adjectives most frequently applied to Mr. Yaeger, both by the press and by his personal acquaintances. “If you saw Edgar Yaeger walking through his Detroit neighborhood, you’d never imagine him to be a celebrated artist. Sometimes the fact seems to even surprise Yaeger himself,” said one contemporary critic. It was true; whatever Yaeger’s personal hierarchy of priorities may have been, it seems fairly certain that self-aggrandizement and self-promotion didn’t rank very highly among them—which goes a long way towards explaining his curious status as an unheralded master among 20th century American modernists.

Neither the press nor the public ever seemed quite certain what to make of Edgar Yaeger. His talent, his commitment to craft, and his skill at integrating and adapting the prevailing styles of the day into his own signature style were always beyond question. How was it, then, that this consummate professional – a man who had studied beneath some of the art world’s luminaries in 1930s Paris and who had exhibited at institutions such as the Museum of Modern Art, the Corcoran Gallery and the Phillips Collection – came to spend the majority of his years living and working in comparative obscurity in Detroit, far from the art world’s bright centers?

Apart from the odd high-profile commission, newspaper story, or significant exhibition, Yaeger lived without substantive honor in either his time or his town. Beyond a small circle of Detroit art cognoscenti, Yaeger remained largely unknown in his hometown even as collectors in France and museums in Miami sought out his work. Of course, Yaeger would be the last to style himself a prophet, and it is true that his oeuvre presents more of a penchant for quiet refinement of others’ innovations—Braque, Picasso, De Chirico, Matisse, Miro and others receive noteworthy nods in Yaeger’s work—than for flamboyant departures of his own. Nonetheless, it takes little more than a quick glance at Yaeger’s output to determine that he did indeed forge his own unique, singular style and contribute his own thread to the tapestry of modernism.

Edgar Louis Yaeger was born in 1904 in Detroit, Michigan, the son of a shoe store owner and the fourth generation of his family to live in the area. Yaeger’s family was hesitantly supportive of his artistic pursuits. In the early years of his life, Yaeger learned a succession of skills from his beloved grandfather, who taught him to draw, to carve figures from blocks of soap and to paint using discarded paints found in an alley, thus laying the foundation for capabilities Yaeger would use throughout his life. By his own account, Yaeger showed little interest for any vocation apart from art; while his father was disappointed that his son wouldn’t follow him into the family shoe business, he lent his grudging support to Yaeger’s artistic pursuits, saying that so long as he was able to earn a living he was free to continue.

Yaeger’s talent began to emerge in earnest during his high school years as he started winning prizes for his drawings and paintings. Scholarships enabled him to pursue his formal artistic training at the University of Detroit, the John P. Wicker School of Fine Arts, and Robert Herzberg’s Detroit School of Fine and Applied Arts. Both to economize and to support himself, Yaeger ground paints for his own use and for sale to fellow students. Concurrently, his work began to attract the attention of a broader audience of influential art patrons. Early recognition arrived in the form of acceptance into the Carnegie International Exhibition in 1930 – a show juried by Henri Matisse.

In 1932, Yaeger won two prizes which would provide a significant boost to his budding career: The Detroit Institute of Arts’ Founders’ Society Purchase Prize and the Detroit News’Anna Scripps Whitcomb Traveling Scholarship. Apart from the increased public profile and prestige afforded by the awards, the $500 Scripps cash award enabled Yaeger to pursue his art education overseas. Yaeger departed for Paris, then still the center of European artistic activity and the home to legions of American expatriates, where he studied at the Academe Andre L’hote and the Ecole Scandinav, where he received instruction from L’hote, Marcel Gromaire and Orthon Friesz.

Yaeger embraced the opportunities for education and inspiration afforded him by life in Paris, relishing the chance to meet other artists, peruse cutting-edge Paris galleries, and to paint in the French countryside as well as the advanced education provided by his European instructors. Forced by economics to return home midway through his European tenure, Yaeger was awarded an additional $500 by the Whitcombs in recognition of his talent and thrift, enabling him to return to France, Yaeger purchased a $10 bicycle upon which he traveled across the continent, drawing, sketching and painting directly from life in a panoply of European settings.

A confluence of factors including escalating tensions in prewar Europe and the American economic depression led Yaeger to return to the United States in 1935. Yeager settled once again in Detroit, taking up residence in his family home where he would remain for the rest of his life. Shortly after his return, Yaeger began to work on a succession of murals commissioned by Franklin Roosevelt’s Works Progress Administration and its landmark Federal Arts Project. While not enamored of the officially-sanctioned Social Realist style favored by program administrators, Yaeger nonetheless joined the ranks of American artistic luminaries commissioned by the FAP to create murals, paintings, and sculptures for WPA sites in Detroit and Ann Arbor.

Yaeger’s FAP commissioned works included murals for Detroit Receiving Hospital’s Children’s Ward, the Ford Grammar School in Highland Park, and Western Market (all now destroyed). A commission for the Detroit Public Lighting Commission, a landmark mural celebrating the historical development of electric light, was partially saved from oblivion prior to the building’s 1977 demolition and is now visible at Michigan State University's Kresge Art Museum. Surviving Yaeger WPA murals exist at the Brodhead Naval Armory (now closed), Grosse Pointe South High School in Grosse Pointe, and the University of Michigan’s West Quad Dormitory.

Yaeger was somewhat dismissive of his WPA-era projects; his reluctance to embrace social realism and his resistance to the influence of program administrators and site managers led him to leave many of these works unsigned. Ironically, they become a cornerstone of his artistic reputation, and likely to his regret, a prism through which the remainder of his life’s work would be perceived by critics and the public. He became pigeonholed in the eyes of some as a “WPA” artist, and with Social Realism’s fall from stylistic favor he received a corresponding lessening of attention and appreciation.

Nonetheless, Yaeger continued to work at a frenetic pace, completing private commissions including mosaics for churches and murals for private clients as well as an endless succession of paintings and drawings. Prizes, gallery exhibitions, and purchases continued to accrue, albeit at a lessened frequency, through the 1960s—even during the Abstract Expressionist, Pop, and Op-Art eras. With the ascendence of conceptualism in the late 1960s-early 1970s and its attendendant dismissal of both painting and representationalism in favor of pure abstraction, Yaeger began to recede into obscurity.

The mid-1980s, however, witnessed something of an Edgar Yaeger renaissance. As conceptualism fell from style and interest in painting returned —thanks in large measure to American Neo-Expressionists such as Julian Schnabel and Jean-Michel Basquiat and Europeans such as Gerhard Richter and Sigmar Polke— stylistic devices favored by Yaeger came once again into vogue. Simultaneously, a Detroit-based group of Yaeger fans led by Yaeger’s friend and agent John Joseph Jr. began evangelizing the artist’s work on his behalf, a practice never undertaken in earnest by the modest Yaeger. A flurry of press attention and new public commissions followed, including an outdoor mosaic on the facade of Detroit’s Scarab Club. For the majority of his remaining years, Yaeger’s work continued to receive steady if low-key attention within Detroit and regional artistic and press circles.

Yaeger's artistic reputation was also bolstered by growing appreciation for his craftsmanship. His patience and dedication to craft are evidenced by the meticulously created handmade frames he made for many of his paintings. Yeager’s method involved assembling dozens of individually cut, sized, and carved pieces of wood into a single frame, carefully combing, filing and finishing the frame until it perfectly suited the picture it housed. Yaeger refused to use power tools for any of these creations, insisting upon a deliberate, careful process of gradual refinement. His exacting standards often resulted in more time being taken in the creation of a frame than in painting the picture itself.

Yaeger’s friends and business associates usually could count on a special annual treat: The arrival of one of his original Christmas cards. Yaeger’s colorful hand-tinted cards were produced through the laborious linocut process; after making his initial sketches, Yaeger would hand-carve his design in reverse onto a piece of linoleum, which he would then ink and press into the individual sheets of paper. Once the ink dried, Yaeger would patiently hand-color each one.

Edgar Yaeger died in 1997 at the age of 93, leaving behind thousands of completed paintings and drawings, a smaller number of reliefs and mosaics, and his legendary murals. Art historians and curators continue to wrestle with Yaeger’s placement in the modernist pantheon, seemingly disinclined to rewrite an official 20th century art narrative which largely excluded him, but institutional support – notably from East Lansing’s Kresge Museum – continues to reaffirm Yaeger’s rightful status as an unheralded modernist master. Such a stature may have been something this introspective master craftsman never expected or pursued, but it is a position he richly deserves.

Collections
Smithsonian Institution, Archives of American Art
Detroit Institute of Arts Museum
Art Gallery of Windsor

References

External links
Artist's website

1904 births
1997 deaths
20th-century American painters
20th-century American male artists
American male painters
Modern artists
Federal Art Project artists